Aaron John Morris (born 30 December 1989) is a Welsh professional footballer who last played as a midfielder for League One club Gillingham. He can also play as a defender and has represented the Wales national under-21 team.

Club career

Cardiff City
Morris was born in Rumney, Cardiff.

Joining Cardiff City as a youth player, he made his first-team debut in a 1–0 victory over Welshpool Town on 23 January 2007 in the FAW Premier Cup and went on to play in the semi-final penalty shoot-out defeat to Newport County three weeks later. The FAW Premier Cup matches would be the only matches he played for the first team during the 2007–08 season.

The start of the 2008–09 season saw Morris handed a full first-team squad number for the first time. In August 2008 Morris was set to join Bournemouth on loan, along with fellow Cardiff player Jonathan Brown. The move fell through later after both clubs overlooked the fact that Morris was still only an academy scholar at Cardiff and was ineligible to be loaned out. On 26 August 2008, Morris came on as a substitute during Cardiff's 2–1 League Cup victory over Milton Keynes Dons after Darcy Blake suffered a hamstring injury.

In December 2009, Morris joined Conference South leaders Newport County initially on a one-month loan arrangement, making his debut in a 3–0 win over Dorchester Town on 28 December. His loan period at Newport concluded 29 February 2010. After returning to Cardiff, Morris made his league debut for the club in the final league game of the 2009–10 season as a substitute in place of Solomon Taiwo during a 2–0 defeat to Derby County. At the end of the 2009–10 season Morris was released by Cardiff, having played 4 games for the club.

Aldershot Town
Following his release, Morris spent time on trial with Brighton & Hove Albion and Exeter City before joining League Two side Aldershot Town on 30 July. In his first start, Morris was named sponsors Man of the Match following a 0–0 draw with Wycombe Wanderers on 18 September 2010. In his first season at Aldershot, Morris made 25 appearances in all competitions. The following season, he was a regular face in the first team squad, playing 45 games in all competitions and scoring his first career goal in a 1–0 victory at Macclesfield Town on 18 February 2012. He scored his second career goal less than a month later on 13 March 2012, scoring after 4 minutes to give Aldershot a 1–0 lead at Crawley Town in a game that ended 2–2. Morris's third season at Aldershot was also his final season with the club, he was everpresent in the side, making 44 appearances, before suffering cruciate ligament damage in the 18th minute of a 3–2 victory over Oxford United that ended his season. He was released at the end of the season as his contract with Aldershot expired and the club was relegated from The Football League.

AFC Wimbledon
Morris once again linked up with Neal Ardley, who brought him through the ranks at Cardiff City, by signing for AFC Wimbledon on 10 January 2014. On the transfer, Ardley stated "I would have signed Aaron in the summer if he was not injured, Aaron can play in a number of positions, but he can be a very good centre-back in my eyes". Morris later tweeted "Been a tough road back but delighted to be back on track and to have signed at AFC Wimbledon, good things to come I'm sure".

Gillingham
Following the 2013–14 season, he signed for Gillingham on a two-year deal. Morris was rewarded with another two-year contract at the conclusion of the 2015–16 season.

International career
In June 2008, Morris was named as a stand-by player for the U19 squad for the Milk Cup tournament held in Northern Ireland. He received his first call-up to the Wales U21 side in February 2009, but the scheduled match against Northern Ireland U21s was called off due to adverse weather. Morris received his second call-up a month later for the qualifying matches against Luxembourg, being handed his first cap in the second meeting of the two sides when he played a full 90 minutes in a 5–1 win.

Career statistics

References

External links
Aaron Morris profile at the Gillingham F.C. website

1989 births
Living people
People from Rumney, Cardiff
Footballers from Cardiff
Wales under-21 international footballers
Association football defenders
Cardiff City F.C. players
Newport County A.F.C. players
Aldershot Town F.C. players
AFC Wimbledon players
Gillingham F.C. players
English Football League players
National League (English football) players
Welsh footballers